was a papal bull issued by Pope Eugene IV in 1434 which excommunicated anyone who enslaves Christians of the Canary Islands.

Background 
Christianity had gained many converts in the Canary Islands by the early 1430s; however the ownership of the lands had been the subject of dispute between Portugal and the Kingdom of Castile. The lack of effective control had resulted in periodic raids on the islands to procure slaves. As early as the Council of Koblenz in 922, the capture of Christians as slaves by other Christians had been condemned.

In 1424 Prince Henry of Portugal sent a fleet to invade Gran Canaria. The expedition failed. By 1432 he tried to persuade his father, John I of Portugal, to finance another attempt. However, when his brother, Duarte inherited the throne in 1433, the new king agreed. A landing on Gran Canaria was made in 1434, but repulsed by the native Guanches, and the expedition then plundered the Castilian missions on Lanzarote and Fuerteventura.

A complaint was lodged by Fernando Calvetos, the Castilian bishop of San Marcial del Rubicón in Lanzarote, supported by the archbishop of Seville. Calvetos informed the pope of the pillaging carried out by the Portuguese "pirates". Pope Eugene IV issued Regimini gregis on 29 September 1434, and Creator Omnium, on 17 December 1434, forbidding any further raids on the Canaries and ordered the immediate manumission of all Christian converts enslaved during the attack.

Content

Creator Omnium alludes to the common humanity between converters and converted. Eugene excommunicated anyone who enslaved newly converted Christians, the penalty to stand until the captive was restored to their liberty and possessions. J. Gordon Melton says that the bull neglects to provide similar protection to those who should resist conversion.

It is not clear to what extent raiders made a distinction between Christian and non-Christian. Michael Stogre holds that Nicholas intended the ban to protect non-Christians as well, in keeping with the view of Innocent IV that the flock of Christ included "pagan sheep" that he ultimately hoped to Christianize.

Portuguese soldiers continued to raid the islands during 1435 and Eugene issued a further edict Sicut Dudum that prohibited wars being waged against the islands and affirming the ban on enslavement.

References

Sources
 Housley, Norman. Religious Warfare in Europe 1400-1536, Oxford University Press, 2002  
 "Christopher Columbus and the enslavement of the Amerindians in the Caribbean. (Columbus and the New World Order 1492-1992).", Sued-Badillo, Jalil, Monthly Review. Monthly Review Foundation, Inc. 1992. HighBeam Research. 10 August 2009
 Monumenta Henricina, (1960–1967), Manuel Lopes de Almeida, Idalino Ferreira da Costa Brochado and Antonio Joaquim

Abolitionism in Africa
1434 works
History of the Canary Islands
15th-century papal bulls
Catholicism and slavery
Documents of Pope Eugene IV